Lake Saint John may refer to:

 Lake St. John (electoral district), a federal electoral district in Quebec, Canada
 Lake St. John (Louisiana), an oxbow lake in Louisiana near Ferriday and Lake Bruin
 Lake Saint John (South Dakota), a lake in Hamlin County, South Dakota
 Lac Saint-Jean, a large, shallow lake in Quebec, Canada